Nikolai Vasilyevich Gosudarenkov (born May 21, 1950) is a Russian professional football coach. As of 2009, he manages an Amateur Football League team FC Novgorod.

Gosudarenkov had a brief spell as caretaker manager of Russian First Division side FC Petrotrest St. Petersburg in June 2005.

References

External links
 Career summary by KLISF

1950 births
Living people
Russian football managers